The Illinois River Road: Route of the Voyageurs is a National Scenic Byway in Central Illinois, United States.

The byway traverses portions of the following routes:

 Interstate 180
 U.S. Route 150
 U.S. Route 24
 U.S. Route 34
 U.S. Route 6
 Illinois Route 9
 Illinois Route 23
 Illinois Route 23
 Illinois Route 26
 Illinois Route 29
 Illinois Route 71
 Illinois Route 78
 Illinois Route 116
 Illinois Route 178
 Illinois Route 351

External links
Illinois River Road official website

National Scenic Byways
Roads in Illinois
U.S. Route 150
U.S. Route 24
U.S. Route 34
U.S. Route 6